The 2019 Orlando Pride season was Orlando Pride's fourth season in the National Women's Soccer League, the top division of women's soccer in the United States. The team played its home games at Exploria Stadium, renamed from Orlando City Stadium on June 4, 2019. Following the departure of Tom Sermanni at the end of the 2018 season, Marc Skinner was announced as his replacement in January.

Notable events
Seven players signed with Australian W-League teams to play with during the 2018–19 NWSL offseason: Chioma Ubogagu and Carson Pickett joined Brisbane Roar, Dani Weatherholt and Christine Nairn joined Melbourne Victory, Rachel Hill joined Perth Glory, Alanna Kennedy joined Sydney FC and Emily van Egmond joined Newcastle Jets. Alanna Kennedy, Rachel Hill and Christine Nairn were named to the W-League Team of the Season. Weatherholt and Nairn won the regular season Premiership title with Melbourne Victory and Kennedy won the 2019 W-League grand final with Sydney FC.

The team's opening day roster was announced on April 10 and included 17 returning squad members. Sydney Leroux was notably placed on the supplemental roster instead of being deactivated on maternity leave in the hope she returned before the end of the season. She returned on September 29, making an 86th minute substitute appearance against Sky Blue FC, just three months after giving birth.

On May 23, after losing Shelina Zadorsky, Emily van Egmond, Camila, Marta, Ali Krieger, Alex Morgan, Alanna Kennedy and Ashlyn Harris to the World Cup, the Pride temporarily signed three National Team Replacement players.

On August 7, the club announced that Toni Pressley underwent surgery and was beginning treatment for breast cancer. She was placed on the 45-day disabled list. The final game of the season was designated as a Breast Cancer Awareness match with the team wearing limited edition pink pre-match warm-up tops to be auctioned off later. All nine NWSL teams also donated autographed items for the online fundraising auction. Pressley made her first appearance since the surgery during the game, coming on as a substitute with Harris handing her the captain's armband.

On August 15, the club announced that Emily van Egmond would undergo season-ending ankle surgery in Australia. She was placed on the season ending injury list.

On September 16, the club announced that Alex Morgan would be placed on the season ending injury list following a knee injury picked up on international duty.

Roster

Staff

Transfers and loans

2019 NWSL College Draft 

Draft picks are not automatically signed to the team roster. The 2019 college draft was held on January 10, 2019. Orlando had two selections.

Transfers in

Transfers out

Preseason trialists 
Orlando Pride began preseason training on March 4, 2019. The squad included eight non-roster invitees on trial with the team during preseason. A total of five were eventually signed by the team with another later added as a temporary national team replacement player.

Match results
As per league schedule, preseason camp began on March 4 with many of the squad still away on international duty. The Pride played their first ever preseason game against fellow NWSL opposition on March 23, taking part in North Carolina Courage's inaugural Friendship Cup which ended in a 4–0 defeat. On March 30, the Pride hosted the University of South Florida for a closed-door friendly, marking the fourth consecutive preseason meeting between the two teams. Liga PR Femenino champions Sol traveled to Orlando the week before the NWSL season began for the final preseason friendly, a match open to the public with for free. The Pride won both of their final two preseason games.

Preseason

National Women's Soccer League

Results summary

Results by round

Results

League standings

Squad statistics

Appearances

Goalscorers

Shutouts

Disciplinary record

Honors and awards

NWSL Team of the Season

NWSL Team of the Month

NWSL Weekly Awards

NWSL Player of the Week

NWSL Goal of the Week

NWSL Save of the Week

References

External links 

 

2019 National Women's Soccer League season
2019
American soccer clubs 2019 season
2019 in sports in Florida